"Boris the Spider" is a song written by the Who's bass guitarist, John Entwistle. It appears as the second track of their 1966 album A Quick One. This song is claimed to be Entwistle's first composition, and became a staple of live shows. This song, along with "My Wife", "Heaven and Hell" and "The Quiet One", were Entwistle's most popular songs to perform live. "The Quiet One" was written to replace this song and "My Wife", which Entwistle had become quite tired of singing. Though this song was popular, it was not released as a single in the US and the UK. In Japan, "Boris the Spider" was released as the B-side to "Whiskey Man" in 1967.

Background 
"Boris the Spider" was written after Entwistle had been out drinking with the Rolling Stones' bass guitarist, Bill Wyman. They were making up funny names for animals when Entwistle came up with "Boris the Spider". The song was written by Entwistle in six minutes and, according to Entwistle in a 1971 interview for Crawdaddy, is considered a horror song.

The chorus of "Boris the Spider" was sung in basso profundo by Entwistle, mimicking a popular Spike Milligan character, Throat, from The Goon Show, (which possibly helped give birth to the "death growl" which would be used heavily in death metal), with a middle eight of "creepy crawly" sung in falsetto.  These discordant passages and the black comedy of the theme made the song a stage favourite.

According to Pete Townshend in his song-by-song review of Meaty Beaty Big and Bouncy for Rolling Stone, it was Jimi Hendrix's favourite Who song.

To commemorate the launch of the BBC's Radio One in 1967, the Who created a brief jingle for the station featuring Entwistle singing "Radio One" to the central riff. This recording was eventually released on the 1995 and 2009 reissues of The Who Sell Out (immediately after their cover of "In the Hall of the Mountain King"), and at the end of their BBC Sessions disc. They created similar jingles to the tune of "My Generation" and "Happy Jack" (available on BBC Sessions and Thirty Years of Maximum R&B, respectively).

Personnel 

 Roger Daltrey - backing vocals
 John Entwistle - lead vocals, bass
 Pete Townshend - backing vocals, guitar
 Keith Moon - drums

Sequel
"My Size", the opening track of Entwistle's 1971 solo album Smash Your Head Against the Wall, is a sequel to "Boris the Spider." The closing riff of the song is the same as the one heard throughout "Boris the Spider." Regarding this, Entwistle stated: "I wrote it as a sequel to Boris the Spider for our manager. Our manager wanted me to put Boris the Spider on my album. So I wrote My Size and I wrote it in a sort of code so it sounds as if it were being sung about a woman. Then I stuck the ending on it as a clue. It wasn't a very good clue, I suppose."

References

The Who songs
1966 singles
Fictional spiders
Songs about spiders
Songs written by John Entwistle
Black comedy music
Novelty songs
Song recordings produced by Kit Lambert
1966 songs